The Alden House is a historic house in a rural part of southern Bentonville, Arkansas. It is a -story wood-frame structure, most notable for a single-story porch, which wraps around three sides of the house. The main entrance is located in the beveled northwest corner of the building. The house, built c. 1900 by the son of Philo Alden, a leading local farmer of the time, has a distinctive combination of Colonial Revival and Eastlake Victorian features.

The house was listed on the National Register of Historic Places in 1988.

See also 
National Register of Historic Places listings in Benton County, Arkansas

References 

Houses on the National Register of Historic Places in Arkansas
Stick-Eastlake architecture in the United States
Colonial Revival architecture in Arkansas
Houses completed in 1900
Houses in Bentonville, Arkansas
National Register of Historic Places in Bentonville, Arkansas
1900 establishments in Arkansas